{{British barrelled name|Delves Broughton at birth'}}

Isabella "Issie" BlowDetmar Blow, Hidden torment of a fashion queen," The Sunday Times, 13 May 2007 (nee Delves Broughton; 19 November 1958 – 7 May 2007) was an English magazine editor. As the muse of hat designer Philip Treacy, she is credited with discovering the models Stella Tennant and Sophie Dahl as well as propelling and continually advocating the career of fashion designer Alexander McQueen, beginning when she bought the entirety of his explosive premier show inspired by Jack the Ripper. She died by suicide in 2007.

Early life
Born Isabella Delves Broughton in Marylebone, London, she was the eldest child of Major Sir Evelyn Delves Broughton, a military officer, and his second wife, Helen Mary Shore, a barrister. Sir Evelyn was the only son of Jock Delves Broughton; his sister, Rosamond, married Simon Fraser, 15th Lord Lovat in 1938.

Blow had two sisters, Julia and Lavinia; her brother, John, drowned in the family's swimming pool at the age of two. This had a profound effect on her. In 1972, when she was 14, her parents separated and her mother left the household, bidding each daughter farewell with a handshake. Her parents divorced two years later. Isabella did not get along with her father, who bequeathed her only £5,000 from his estate, which was worth more than one million pounds.

Blow studied for her A-levels at Heathfield School, after which she enrolled at a secretarial college and then took odd jobs. She told Tamsin Blanchard of The Observer in 2002: I've done the most peculiar jobs. I was working in a scone shop for years, selling apricot-studded scones. I was a cleaner in London for two years. I wore a handkerchief with knots on the side, and my cousin saw me in the post office and said, What are you doing? I said, What do you think I look like I'm doing? I'm a cleaner!

Career
Blow moved to New York City in 1979 to study Ancient Chinese Art at Columbia University and shared a flat with the actress Catherine Oxenberg. A year later, she left the Art History programme at Columbia, moved to Texas, and worked for Guy Laroche. In 1981 she married her first husband, Nicholas Taylor (whom she divorced in 1983), and was introduced to the fashion director of the US edition of Vogue, Anna Wintour. Blow was hired initially as Wintour's assistant, but it was not long before she was assisting André Leon Talley, as of 2008 US Vogues editor-at-large. While working in New York, she befriended Andy Warhol and Jean-Michel Basquiat.

She returned to London in 1986 and worked for Michael Roberts, then the fashion director of Tatler and The Sunday Times Style magazine. During this period she was romantically linked to editor Tim Willis.  In 1989, Blow married her second husband, barrister and art dealer Detmar Hamilton Blow, a grandson of the early 20th-century society architect Detmar Blow, in Gloucester Cathedral. Philip Treacy designed the bride's wedding headdress and a now-famous fashion relationship was forged. Realizing Treacy's talent, Blow established Treacy in her London flat, where he worked on his collections. She soon began wearing Treacy's hats, making them a signature part of her flamboyant style. In a 2002 interview with Tamsin Blanchard, Blow declared that she wore extravagant hats for a practical reason: [...] to keep everyone away from me. They say, Oh, can I kiss you? I say, No, thank you very much. That's why I've worn the hat. Goodbye. I don't want to be kissed by all and sundry. I want to be kissed by the people I love.
In 1993 she worked with the photographer Steven Meisel producing the Babes in London shoot, which featured Plum Sykes, Bella Freud and Honor Fraser. Blow had a natural sense of style and a good feeling for future fashion directions. She discovered Alexander McQueen and purchased his entire graduate collection for £5,000, paying it off in weekly £100 installments. Spotting Sophie Dahl, Blow described her as "a blow up doll with brains", and launched the model's career. Blow supported both the fashion world and the art world. Artists Tim Noble and Sue Webster created a shadow portrait of her which was displayed in the National Portrait Gallery. Blow was the fashion director of Tatler and consulted for DuPont Lycra, Lacoste, and Swarovski. She became the subject of an exhibition in 2002 entitled When Philip met Isabella, which featured sketches and photographs of her wearing Treacy's hat designs.

In 2004 Blow had an acting cameo playing a character called Antonia Cook in the film The Life Aquatic with Steve Zissou. She starred in 2005 in a project by artist Matthieu Laurette, commissioned and produced by Frieze Projects 2005 and entitled "What Do They Wear at Frieze Art Fair?" It consisted of daily guided tours of Frieze Art Fair led by Blow and fellow international fashion experts Peter Saville, Kira Joliffe, and Bay Garnett. Shortly before her death, Blow was the creative director and stylist of a series of books for an Arabic beauty magazine, Alef; the books were being produced by Kuwaiti fashion entrepreneur Sheikh Majed al-Sabah.

Illness
Toward the end of her life, Blow became seriously depressed and was reportedly anguished over her inability to "find a home in a world she influenced". Daphne Guinness, a friend of Blow's, stated: "She was upset that Alexander McQueen didn't take her along when he sold his brand to Gucci. Once the deals started happening, she fell by the wayside. Everybody else got contracts, and she got a free dress". According to a 2002 interview with Tamsin Blanchard, it was Blow who brokered the deal in which Gucci purchased McQueen's label. Other pressures on her included financial problems (Blow was disinherited by her father in 1994) and infertility.

Isabella and Detmar Blow separated in 2004. Detmar Blow went on to have an affair with Stephanie Theobald, the society editor of British Harper's Bazaar, while his estranged wife entered into a liaison with a gondolier she met in Venice. During the couple's separation, Blow was diagnosed with bipolar disorder and began undergoing electroshock therapy. For a time, the treatments appeared to be helpful. During this period she also had an affair with Matthew Mellon; however, after an eighteen-month separation, Isabella and Detmar Blow were reconciled. Soon afterward, she was diagnosed with ovarian cancer.

Depressed over her waning celebrity status and her cancer diagnosis, Blow began telling friends that she was suicidal. In 2006, Blow attempted suicide with an overdose of sleeping pills. Later that year, Blow again attempted suicide by jumping from the Hammersmith Flyover, which resulted in her breaking both ankles. Blow made several more suicide attempts in 2007, by driving her car into the rear of a lorry, attempting to obtain horse tranquilizers, trying to drown herself in a lake and by overdosing while on a beach in India.

Death
On 6 May 2007, during a weekend house party at Hilles, where the guests included Treacy and his partner, Stefan Bartlett, Blow announced that she was going shopping. Instead, she was later discovered collapsed on a bathroom floor by her sister Lavinia and was taken to Gloucestershire Royal Hospital, where Blow told the doctor she had drunk the weedkiller paraquat. She died at the hospital the following day. Blow's death was initially reported as being caused by ovarian cancer; however, a coroner later ruled the death a suicide. At the inquest, Blow's sister, Lavinia Verney, stated that after she discovered her sister had ingested the poison, Blow had told her, "I'm worried that I haven't taken enough."

Her funeral was held at Gloucester Cathedral on 15 May 2007. Her casket, made of willow, was surmounted by one of her Philip Treacy hats as well as a floral tribute, and her pallbearers included her godson Otis Ferry, a son of the rock star Bryan Ferry. (In 2010, Bryan Ferry dedicated his Olympia album in memoriam Isabella Blow and David Williams.) Actor Rupert Everett and actress Joan Collins delivered eulogies. Opera singer Charles Eliasch sang. A memorial service was held in the Guards Chapel in London on 18 September 2007, where Anna Wintour and Geordie Greig spoke. Prince Michael and Princess Michael of Kent were in attendance. Wintour's eulogy and part of the memorial service can be seen in DVD disc two of The September Issue.

References

Further reading
Blow, Detmar with Tom Sykes, Blow by Blow: The Story of Isabella Blow, New York: HarperCollins, 2010, .
Crowe, Lauren Goldstein, Isabella Blow: A Life in Fashion'', New York: Thomas Dunne Books, 2010, .

External links

 Isabella Blow, A Life In Fashion,  Nov 8 2010

1958 births
2007 deaths
Vogue (magazine) people
Fashion editors
English magazine editors
Daughters of baronets
Muses
People with bipolar disorder
People from Gloucester
Writers from London
Suicides by poison
Suicides in England
People educated at Heathfield School, Ascot
2007 suicides
Alexander McQueen